Small glutamine-rich tetratricopeptide repeat-containing protein alpha is a protein that in humans is encoded by the SGTA gene. SGTA orthologs have also been identified in several mammals for which complete genome data are available.

Function 
This gene encodes a protein which is capable of interacting with the major nonstructural protein of parvovirus H-1 and 70-kDa heat shock cognate protein; however, its function is not known. Since this transcript is expressed ubiquitously in various tissues, this protein may serve a housekeeping function.

Interactions 
SGTA has been shown to interact with Growth hormone receptor.

References

Further reading 

 
 
 
 
 
 
 
 
 
 
 
 
 
 
 
 

Co-chaperones